Émile, Baron Braun (2 December 1849 – 30 August 1927) was an engineer, Belgian liberal politician and manager of companies in the textile industry.

He was provincial Council member for East Flanders (1891–1898), mayor of Ghent (1895–1921) and a member of parliament (1900–1925) for the liberal party. While he was mayor, the World Fair of Ghent took place in 1913–1914. Emile Braun was raised to nobility in 1922. The people from Ghent gave him the nickname Miele Zoetekoeke i.e. Emile sweet-cake.

Honours 
 1919 : Grand officer in the Order of the Crown.

Sources

 Emile Braun (Liberal Archive)

1849 births
1927 deaths
People from Nivelles

19th-century Belgian engineers
20th-century Belgian engineers
Flemish engineers
Barons of Belgium
Mayors of Ghent